Phrynocephalus guttatus, also known commonly as the spotted toadhead agama, the Saissan toad-headed agama, the Central Asian toadhead agama, and Salensky's toadhead agama, is a species of lizard in the family Agamidae. The species is native to southeastern Europe and western Asia. There are five recognized subspecies.

Geographic range
P. guttatus is found in Kazakhstan, southern Russia, Turkmenistan, and Uzbekistan.

Habitat

Reproduction
P. guttatus is oviparous.

Subspecies
Five subspecies are recognized as being valid, including the nominotypical subspecies. 
Phrynocephalus guttatus alpherakii 
Phrynocephalus guttatus guttatus 
Phrynocephalus guttatus melanurus  – Saissan toad-headed agama
Phrynocephalus guttatus moltschanowi 
Phrynocephalus guttatus salsatus 

Nota bene: A trinomial authority in parentheses indicates that the subspecies was originally described in a genus other than Phrynocephalus.

References

Further reading
Eichwald, "Eduardus" (1831). Zoologia specialis, quam expositis animalibus tum vivis, tum fossilibus potissimum rossiae in universum, et poloniae in specie, in usum lectionum  publicarum in Universitate Caesarea Vilnensi [Volume III]. Vilnius: J. Zawadzki. 404 pp. (Phrynocephalus melanurus, new species, p. 186). (in Latin).
Gmelin JF (1789). Caroli a Linné Systema Naturæ. Editio Decima Tertia [13th edition]. Tomus I. Pars III. Classis III. Amphibia. Leipzig: G.E. Beer. pp. 1033–1125. (Lacerta guttata, new species, p. 1078). (in Latin).
Sindaco R, Jeremčenko VK (2008). The Reptiles of the Western Palearctic. 1. Annotated Checklist and Distributional Atlas of the Turtles, Crocodiles, Amphisbaenians and Lizards of Europe, North Africa, Middle East and Central Asia. (Monographs of the Societas Herpetologica Italica). Latina, Italy: Edizioni Belvedere. 580 pp. .

guttatus
Reptiles described in 1789
Taxa named by Johann Friedrich Gmelin